Senator Knudson may refer to:

Dave Knudson (politician) (born 1950), South Dakota State Senate
Harvey B. Knudson (1903–1978), North Dakota State Senate
Norman Knudson (1874–1934), Wisconsin State Senate
Peter C. Knudson (born 1937), Utah State Senate

See also
Senator Knutson (disambiguation)